Henry White Beeson (September 14, 1791 – October 28, 1863) was a Democratic member of the U.S. House of Representatives from Pennsylvania.

Henry White Beeson was born in Uniontown, Pennsylvania.  He attended the public schools and engaged in agricultural pursuits.  He served as a colonel in the Fayette County Militia.

Beeson was elected as a Democrat to the Twenty-seventh Congress to fill the vacancy caused by the resignation of Enos Hook.  He was an unsuccessful candidate for reelection in 1842 to the Twenty-eighth Congress.  He resumed agricultural pursuits and died in North Union Township, Pennsylvania, near Uniontown.  Interment in Oak Hill Cemetery.

Sources

The Political Graveyard

1791 births
1863 deaths
People from Uniontown, Pennsylvania
Democratic Party members of the United States House of Representatives from Pennsylvania
19th-century American politicians